Sanford Hinderlie (born January 23, 1952) is an American jazz pianist, composer, educator, and record producer. He is currently the Conrad N. Hilton Chair of Music Industry Studies at Loyola University New Orleans, where he has taught since 1981.

Career
A native of Seattle, Hinderlie began playing piano at an early age, imitating his parents, who were also musicians. Earning a B.M. from Washington State University and a M.M. from North Texas State University, he studied composition with Martin Mailman, Larry Austin, and Merrill Ellis, and jazz piano with Dan Haerle. In 1981, he moved to New Orleans, where he has taught, performed, and recorded music ever since.

As a performer, Hinderlie is noted for his transparent, sophisticated jazz style, exhibiting a lively virtuosity that reflects the wide range of influences on which he draws. As well as his original works in jazz piano, Hinderlie has composed scores for film and video, including soundtracks for documentaries on New Orleans history, and is a past winner of the Delius Composition Competition. Alongside his solo work, Hinderlie is also a frequent collaborator with other musicians, appearing with such performers as John Rankin, Tom McDermott, Tony Dagradi, Steve Masakowski, Larry Sieberth, Johnny Vidacovich, Tom van der Geld, and Günter Heinz.

Within the United States, and particularly in New Orleans, he is a regular performer at venues and festivals year-round, and maintained a 25-year residency (1991-2016) at the Pelican Club in New Orleans’ French Quarter. Outside the United States, his performances have included venues in Germany, Panama, Denmark, the Netherlands, Singapore, Hong Kong, and Japan, and he has been a guest artist at such venues as the Yerevan International Jazz Festival in Armenia, the United States Embassy in Tbilisi, Georgia, and the Schloss Lingerberg in Dresden, Germany. On YouTube, a solo concert for jazz piano given in 2011 has been viewed over 250,000 times.

Teaching, Research and Producing

As an educator, Hinderlie has pioneered the development of new techniques and technologies in music education and promotion (see Section 3). At Loyola, Hinderlie spearheaded new opportunities in recording and music technology by building studios and labs for student learning, as well as creating internships in local recording studios and radio stations, including the historic WWOZ-FM.

Since 1988 he has secured more than $1.8 million in outside grant funding as a principal or co-principal investigator. From 2008 to 2009, he was the Benjamin Distinguished Professor of Music, and from 2009 to 2014, he held the Rita O. Huntsinger Distinguished Professorship of Music. In 2017-2018 he received an ATLAS grant from the Louisiana Board of Regents to complete his collaborative recording, Summer Haze (2021). Among other professional associations, he has been a member of the College Music Society, the Music and Entertainment Industry Educators Association, the Association for Technology in Music Instruction, the Society of Electro-Acoustic Music United States, and the National Academy of Recording Arts and Sciences.

Since 1995, under the label STR Digital Records, Hinderlie has produced, recorded and mastered 26 CDs which are now distributed worldwide by CPI Distribution.

Critical reception

Hinderlie's innovations in music technology have drawn critical interest for decades. On the opening of the Music Technology Center at Loyola University in 1989, Joseph LaRose of the Clarion Herald noted Hinderlie's role as director of the center, reporting that “Between 120 and 300 students will use the center every year, learning music theory, composition, electronic music, jazz, commercial music, and recording techniques.” Describing the center's equipment and opportunities, LaRose observed that “Electronic ingenuity has gone far beyond plugging electric guitars into gargantuan amplifiers, and thanks to its new Music Technology Center, Loyola music students are part of the electronic music revolution.”  That same year, the Loyola Maroon detailed how Hinderlie's Synthesis 2000 ensemble “stretches the bounds of modern music through carefully manipulated computer-controlled synthesizers,” describing the result as an “eclectic mélange of sounds and rhythms ... a blend of classical, jazz, new age, funk, improvisation and rock all added together.” Noting that his 1989 visit to the Tbilisi Conservatory in the Republic of Georgia (Soviet Union) had served as a key cross-cultural exchange, the Maroon reflected on how Hinderlie's travels and his experiments in electronic music “allow him to expand and diversify his already unique musical style.”

Hinderlie's skill as a performer and composer has also received acclaim. Music critics for the New Orleans Times-Picayune have praised his “vivid and exhilarating” achievements, noting that his musical effects are “purposefully applied, with little waste motion for the sake of chic, and the musicality and theatricality of his pieces [are] mutually supportive.”  These critics have also described Hinderlie as “one of the most inventive and solidly accomplished talents in town. As George Crumb did in the 1960s, Hinderlie employs unorthodox methods but comes up with an entertaining product unlikely to antagonize even the most conservative. Either by instinct or by design, he composes for the audience as well as for the musician. ... [He is] a musician of great authority and appeal.”  Similarly, critic Melissa Wong has praised the “fluidity of his interpretations,” characterizing Hinderlie's presence as a performer as “exclusive to the stage, making constant contact with his instrument and fellow musicians. He demonstrate[s] self-confidence, yet he remain[s] personal with the audience with casual joking over the microphone between songs.” 

On the eve of a performance in 1996, critic Ann McCutchan of Wavelength magazine called Hinderlie “definitely one-of-a-kind on the New Orleans music scene, [who] has lately been going national with his improvisational dreamscapes.” McCutchan observed Hinderlie's constant efforts at refinement of his work, “filing away ideas for new pieces that he says will employ more live percussion instruments and complex electronic rhythm effects,” quoting Hinderlie's desire “to spark people’s imaginations so they can carry my music one step beyond the live performance and create their own sound pictures, their own dreams.”

In his later years Hinderlie's efforts as an educator and catalyst for student development have also received attention. Detailing the changing fortunes at Loyola University New Orleans, Offbeat magazine reported in 2015 that “when Loyola recently restructured its degree programs as a result of falling enrollment (not unlike other universities nationwide and locally), the Music Industry Studies program was left intact ... because it's growing,” naming Hinderlie as one of the core MIS faculty.  Most recently, Offbeat named him the recipient of the 2021 Lifetime Achievement in Music Education Award, citing his 40-year career in bringing new recording and performing technology to music students in Louisiana, and his co-founding the Bachelor of Science degree in Popular and Commercial Music at Loyola, one of the fastest-growing majors in the university.

Discography

Performed

 Summer Haze (STR Digital Records, 2021). Piano with Tom van der Geld, vibraphone.
 Christmas in New Orleans (STR Digital Records, 2010). Solo piano.
 Hinderlie Plays Hinderlie (STR Digital Records, 2004). Solo piano.
 Patchwork: A Tribute to James Booker (STR Digital Records, 2003). feat. Marcia Ball, Henry Butler, Leigh Harris, Sanford Hinderlie, Joe Krown, Tom McDermott, Josh Paxton, and Larry Sieberth.
 Solo Flight (STR Digital Records, 1995). Solo piano.

Produced

 Evan Christopher, Clarinet Road IV: Bayou Chant (2016). feat. David Torkanowsky, Joe Ashler, Roland Guerin, and Brian Seegar.
 Evan Christopher, Clarinet Road III (2011)
 Mike Hood, Hocus Pocus (2008)
 Tom McDermott, Live in Paris (2007)
 Tom McDermott, Choro (2005)
 Joe Krown, The New Orleans Piano Rolls (2003)
 Tom McDermott, All the Keys and Then Some (1996, 2002)
 Evan Christopher, Clarinet Road II (2002)
 Evan Christopher, Clarinet Road I (2002)
 Tom McDermott and Evan Christopher, Danza (2002)
 Joe Krown, Funk Yard (2002)
 John Rankin, Guitar Gumbo (2002)
 Kim Prevost, Talk To Me (2002). feat. Nicholas Payton. 
 Xie Xuemei, Xie Xuemei (2001)
 Ricky Sebastian, The Spirit from Within (2001). feat. Donald Harrison, Clarence Johnson, Steve Masakowski, Randy Brecker and Bill Summers.
 Joe Krown, Buckle Up (2001)
 Tom McDermott, The Crave (2001)
 Kim Prevost and Amina Figarova, On Canal Street (2001)
 Joe Krown, Down and Dirty (2000)
 Kim Prevost and Bill Solley, I Would Give All My Love (2000)
 Guy Beck, Sacred Ragas (1998)
 Tom McDermott, Louisianthology (1998)
 Clarence Johnson, Dedicated to You (1997)
 Vahag Petian, Trip to New Orleans (1997)
 Clarence Johnson and Vahag Petian, Love for Sale (1997)
 Joe Krown, Just the Piano, Just the Blues (1997)
 Annual Offbeat magazine CD sent to subscribers, 2005 & 2007
 Guy Beck, Sacred Sound: Music and World. CD accompaniment to book. (Wilfrid Laurier University Press, 2005)
 Guy Beck, Sacred Sound: Experiencing Music and Chant in World Religions. CD accompaniment to book. (Wilfrid Laurier University Press, 2001)
 David Montgomery, Schubert and Loewe: Grand Duos for Piano 4-Hands (Mastered for Sony Germany/Klavier, 1998)

References

External links
Official website
Faculty page at the Loyola University of New Orleans

1952 births
Living people